The Canadian Lacrosse Hall of Fame is a Canadian lacrosse hall of fame, located in New Westminster, British Columbia, Canada. The Hall was chartered in 1965 by the Canadian Lacrosse Association, and inducted its first class of hall of famers in the following year.

History

Induction of new members is made on an annual basis.  In 1965, three categories were inaugurated: Field Players, Box Players and Builders. A Veteran category was added in 1997 to preserve the memory of stars of yesteryear, and in 1988, an outstanding Team category was also added. Starting in 2016, the box player and field player categories were merged into the Player category with no distinction made between box and field versions of the sport. Due to the COVID-19 pandemic cancelling the induction dinner that year, the 2020 inductees were inducted into the hall in 2021 along with the 2021 inductees. An Officials category, covering on-floor game officials such as referees, was added for the 2022 induction year. Also added for the 2022 induction process was a National selection committee - to better represent aspects of the sport not previously represented well by the existing Eastern and Western selection committees.

List of Hall of Fame inductees

See also
 Canadian Lacrosse Hall of Fame - Honoured Member Page
National Lacrosse Hall of Fame (US)
National Lacrosse League Hall of Fame
Tewaaraton Trophy

References

External links

Canadian
Lacrosse
Lacrosse
Lacrosse museums and halls of fame
Museums in British Columbia
Sports museums in Canada
New Westminster